Pamizinisaurus is a genus of sphenodontian reptile known from Lower Cretaceous (Albian) Tlayúa Formation of Mexico. A  crushed skeleton of a juvenile reptile was found in Tlayua Quarry, in central Mexico. It was named Pamizinsaurus tlayuaensis by Reynoso in 1997, after the name of the quarry of which it was found. The fossil was covered in small round osteoderms that could have protected it from predators.

Relatives
Reynoso (1997) argued that Pamizinsaurus was a genus of the subfamily Sphenodontinae; grouping it with the modern Sphenodon (better known as the Tuatara), Zapatadon, Cynosphenodon, Homoeosaurus, Sapheosaurus, and Ankylosphenodon.

References

External links
Professor Paul's Guide to Reptiles

Sphenodontia
Early Cretaceous reptiles of North America
Prehistoric reptile genera